La Tribune is a Canadian daily newspaper published in Sherbrooke, Quebec.

The newspaper was founded on 21 February 1910 by Jacob Nicol, who would be appointed as senator in 1944. The first issue was published from a building in rue Wellington nord. The address later moved to 221 rue Dufferin at rue Frontenac and, in October 1976, again to 1950 rue Roy, in the industrial park in the west of the city.

It was purchased by Paul Desmarais in 1955. It was sold on 14 March 2015 by Gesca to Groupe Capitales Médias, run by Martin Cauchon. The sale included La Tribune and five other regional publications. 

The paper spawned a radio and television station with the CHLT call letters. The radio station is now CKOY-FM, while the television station still has the CHLT calls.

See also
List of newspapers in Canada

References

Newspapers published in Sherbrooke
Daily newspapers published in Quebec
Newspapers established in 1910
1910 establishments in Quebec